Gryllus texensis is a species of cricket described by William H. Cade and Otte in (2000).  Cade and Otte clarify that field crickets collected in the Southeastern United States from Florida to Texas identified as Gryllus integer, were in fact misidentified, and should have been classified as G. texensis.  Morphologically, Cade and Otte found no differences between G. texensis and Gryllus rubens, however, their call song structure was significantly different (see Gray and Cade (1999)).

References
 Taxonomic identification of G. texensis (Cade and Otte, 2000)
 Phylogenetic description showing G. rubens and G. texensis as closest relatives based on mitochondrial DNA (Huang et al. 2000)

texensis
Insects described in 2000
Taxa named by Dan Otte
Taxa named by William H. Cade